Piotr Ugrumov (Latvian: Pēteris Ugrjumovs or Pjotrs Ugrjumovs, Russian: Пётр Угрюмов) (born 21 January 1961) is a former Russian professional road racing cyclist who participated for Latvia after the dissolution of the Soviet Union, though he was a part of the Russian delegation at the 1996 Summer Olympics. His career as a professional lasted from 1989 to 1999, he had ten victories. Ugrumov finished second at the 1994 Tour de France. Between 1990 and 1996 he came in the Top 10 of seven Grand Tours, four in the Giro, two in the Tour and one in the Vuelta.

Major results
Sources:

1982
 8th Overall Tour de l'Avenir
1983
 1st Stage 4a Ruban Granitier Breton
1984
 1st  Overall Giro Ciclistico d'Italia
 1st Prologue Course de la Paix
 1st Prologue Tour de l'Avenir
1986
 1st  Overall Troféu Joaquim Agostinho
1st Stage 1 (TTT)
 10th Overall Coors Classic
1987
 1st  Overall Circuit Cycliste Sarthe
1st Stage 3
 2nd Overall Okolo Slovenska
 3rd Overall Tour de l'Avenir
1988
 3rd Overall Course de la Paix
 3rd Overall Giro Ciclistico d'Italia
1989
 4th Coppa Bernocchi
 7th Coppa Sabatini
 8th Gran Premio Città di Camaiore
1990
 2nd Overall Giro del Trentino
 4th Firenze–Pistoia 
 5th Giro dell'Appennino
 5th Coppa Ugo Agostoni
 5th Coppa Bernocchi
 6th Giro del Friuli
 8th Overall Giro d'Italia
 9th Trofeo Laigueglia
1991
 1st  Overall Vuelta a Asturias
 2nd Overall Euskal Bizikleta
 2nd Overall Tour of Galicia
 2nd Clásica a los Puertos
 3rd Overall Tour of the Basque Country
 4th Subida al Naranco
 5th Overall Volta a Catalunya
 8th Overall Vuelta a España
 8th Clásica de San Sebastián
 8th Escalada a Montjuïc
1992
 2nd Overall Vuelta a Aragón
 2nd Overall Euskal Bizikleta
 4th Klasika Primavera
 5th Vuelta a La Rioja
 7th Road race, UCI Road World Championships
1993
 1st  Overall Euskal Bizikleta
 1st Giro del Friuli
 2nd Overall Giro d'Italia
1st Stage 4
 2nd GP Industria & Artigianato
 3rd Coppa Placci
 3rd Coppa Sabatini
 4th Giro dell'Emilia
 5th Overall Tour de Romandie
 7th Giro di Lombardia
1994
 2nd Overall Tour de France
1st Stages 18 & 19 (ITT)
 2nd Giro di Romagna
 4th Telekom Grand Prix (with Claudio Chiappucci)
 10th Road race, UCI Road World Championships
1995
 3rd Overall Giro d'Italia
 3rd Overall Tour de Romandie
 5th Firenze–Pistoia 
1996
 3rd Overall Rothaus Regio-Tour International
 3rd Klasika Primavera
 3rd Coppa Ugo Agostoni
 4th Overall Giro d'Italia
 5th Road race, National Road Championships (Russia)
 7th Overall Tour de France
 8th Overall Tour de Romandie
1997
 5th Giro del Piemonte
 7th Overall Tour de Pologne
1998
 1st Luk-Cup Bühl
 2nd Road race, National Road Championships (Russia)

Grand Tour general classification results timeline

References

External links
 
 

1961 births
Living people
Latvian Giro d'Italia stage winners
Latvian male cyclists
Latvian Tour de France stage winners
Olympic cyclists of Russia
Cyclists at the 1996 Summer Olympics
Sportspeople from Riga